This is a list of all tornadoes that were confirmed by local offices of the National Weather Service in the United States in May 2011. Following the record tornado activity in April, during which 773 tornadoes struck the United States, May exhibited an unusually low number of tornadoes for the first three weeks. Only isolated events occurred until May 9, when five tornadoes struck Nebraska and South Dakota. A small outbreak of 16 tornadoes occurred across the Central United States, with EF0 to EF1 tornadoes caused mainly minor damage across states such as Nebraska, Iowa, and Missouri. The following few days saw isolated tornadoes strike Nebraska, Louisiana, Ohio, Maryland, and Colorado. Scattered weak tornadoes on May 19 impacted Texas, Oklahoma, Kansas, and Colorado, while six more weak tornadoes occurred on May 20. This included an EF1 tornado in Prairie County, Montana, which damaged a ranch.

Activity then abruptly increased with a prolonged and violent tornado outbreak sequence taking place from May 21–26, resulting in 178 fatalities. An EF3 tornado struck Reading, Kansas on May 21, resulting in severe damage and one fatality. An EF5 tornado in Joplin, Missouri resulted in 158 fatalities on May 22, becoming one of the deadliest tornadoes in United States history. This tornado was the most severe of the outbreak, and it caused catastrophic damage across southern portions of the city of Joplin. Elsewhere on May 22, another person was killed by an EF1 tornado that struck Minneapolis, Minnesota and surrounding suburbs, and a high-end EF3 tornado moved from Delaware County, Oklahoma to McDonald County, Missouri, with numerous homes being destroyed. On May 24, a significant outbreak took place in Oklahoma and Arkansas, with another EF5 tornado and two EF4 tornadoes striking areas around Oklahoma City. These three tornadoes resulting in ten fatalities and nearly 300 injuries. Another EF4 tornado moved through Denning, Arkansas just before midnight, with four additional deaths. May 25 featured a large number of tornadoes across Missouri, Illinois and Indiana, with several more tornadoes in other states. This activity continued into the next day, when an EF3 tornado impacted part of St. Tammany Parish, Louisiana and injured four people.

Sporadic tornado activity continued over the final five days of May, most notably on May 30, when approximately 15 tornadoes impacted the northern Great Plains. These included four tornadoes–three EF2 and one EF1–in the Fargo, North Dakota area, resulting in heavy damage to buildings and electrical transmission lines.

United States yearly total

May

May 1 event

May 2 event

May 7 event

May 8 event

May 9 event

May 10 event

May 11 event

May 12 event

May 13 event

May 14 event

May 17 event

May 18 event

May 19 event

May 20 event

May 21 event

May 22 event

May 23 event

May 24 event

May 25 event

May 26 event

May 27 event

May 28 event

May 29 event

May 30 event

May 31 event

See also
 Tornadoes of 2011

Notes

References

United States,05
Tornadoes,05
Tornadoes
2011,05